This article contains the filmography of Yuen Wah.

Films

Television

References

Yuen Wah
Yuen Wah
Yuen Wah